Oberea truncatipennis is a species of beetle in the family Cerambycidae. It was described by Stephan von Breuning in 1962. It is known from Borneo.

References

Beetles described in 1962
truncatipennis